Nicolas Yonezuka is a former American competitor in the sport of judo. He was born in 1965, and is from New Jersey. Yonezuka attended Watchung Hills Regional High School, where he made the schools Hall of Fame. He was taught judo by his father, Yoshisada Yonezuka. Nicolas was a 5 time US National Judo Champion, and qualified for the 1980 U.S. Olympic team but did not compete due to the U.S. Olympic Committee's boycott of the 1980 Summer Olympics in Moscow, Russia at the age of 16. He was one of 461 athletes to receive a Congressional Gold Medal many years later.

References

American male judoka
1965 births
Living people
Congressional Gold Medal recipients
20th-century American people
21st-century American people